Boundless may refer to:
 Boundless (album), a 2001 album by Rajaton
 Boundless (company), an American textbook company
 Boundless (video game), a video game
 Boundless (Canadian TV series), a reality TV series
 Boundless (Spanish TV series), a 2021 miniseries
 Boundless.org, a website for young adults operated by Focus on the Family
 Boundless by CSMA, a club for civil servants in the United Kingdom
 Boundless Technologies or SunRiver Data Systems, an IT company
 "Boundless", a song by Aero Chord
 The Boundless, a young adult novel by Kenneth Oppel
 Apeiron, a concept in ancient Greek cosmology translated as "boundless"

See also
 Boundedness (disambiguation)